Hakim Optical Lab Ltd. is a Canadian optical chain, the largest privately owned optical chain in Canada. In 2016 it had about 160 stores.

Founder 

Karim Hakimi, a native of Iran, learned to make lenses from old window glass as a child.  After a stint in the navy, Hakimi worked in the optical industry in Switzerland. He then migrated to Canada and opened an optical laboratory in the former Elmwood Hotel (now the Elmwood Spa) in downtown Toronto, Ontario. He bought and rebuilt old equipment from a closed-down lab in Chicago. After making a variety of lenses, he began selling them to local optometrists.  He soon began selling lenses directly from the Elmwood location. 

The company has sold over 40 million pairs of glasses. Karim Hakimi remains CEO, and runs the day-to-day operations at Hakim head office located at 128 Hazelton Avenue in Toronto.

On October 18, 2008, the City of Toronto government renamed Lebovic Avenue in the Scarborough district to Hakimi Avenue. The City of Toronto does not normally name streets after living persons but made an exception in recognition of Hakimi's contributions. A documentary about Hakim Optical and its founder, titled Hakim: A Vision of Success, was made for Omni Television with Persian subtitles.

Early history 
As the business grew, he opened a small storefront near his home at Highway 10 and Dundas Street in 1967, enabling him to both manufacture and retail glasses. The next store was at Yonge Street and Finch Avenue, near the current Finch subway station.

By 1985, Hakimi had opened 27 stores, 25 in Ontario and 2 in Nova Scotia. Many of these offered on-site, one-hour service.  The chain had 200 employees, many of them newcomers to Canada. 

Hakim Optical has promoted its optical chain with its trademark jingle "Your Eyes Can Have it All at Hakim Optical" since 2003, which has been named by Huffington Post Canada as one of Canada's most memorable jingles and is still used.

Retail locations 
On May 1, 2011, Hakim Optical opened its new flagship location at Yonge–Dundas Square in Toronto which is two blocks away from the original 1967 location.

In November 2017, Hakim Optical partnered with virtual reality and augmented reality agency VusionVR Inc. to expand the in-store service by offering an app that would take a customer's selfie and apply a Snapchat-like filter of the eyewear being considered for purchase. 

As of June 2020, Hakim Optical had 161 retail locations (including 140 one-hour factory outlets) across Canada and also operates six lens factories.

References

External links

Hakim Optical

Eyewear retailers of Canada
Canadian companies established in 1967
Retail companies established in 1967
Eyewear companies of Canada
Canadian brands
1967 establishments in Ontario